Pim Bekkering (9 August 193125 February 2014) was a Dutch football player.

Club career
Nicknamed de Kat (the Cat), Bekkering made his professional debut for then Tweede Divisie side HVV 't Gooi in the 1956-57 season. He left them a year later for PSV for whom he would play 121 league games in 10 seasons. He was replaced in the PSV goal by Gert Bals, spending a large part of his PSV career as the second goalkeeper.

Retirement and death
Bekkering used to work for Philips. He died in February 2014.

References

1931 births
2014 deaths
Footballers from Amsterdam
Association football goalkeepers
Dutch footballers
PSV Eindhoven players
SC 't Gooi players